The 2016 Sudamérica Rugby Cup was the third edition of the Sudamérica Rugby Cup, and its first with the current name, since CONSUR had re-branded itself as Sudamérica Rugby in July 2015. Argentina were automatically seeded and qualified for the tournament as the top ranked side in South America, while Chile and Uruguay qualified by virtue of being the top two ranked teams in the 2015 South American Rugby Championship "A".

The last game of the 2016 South American Rugby Championship "A", between Uruguay and Chile, doubled as the opening game of the Sudamérica Rugby Cup this year.

Standings

Matches
The game day schedule was announced and released on February 23, 2016.

Round 1

Round 2

Round 3

See also
South American Rugby Championship
2016 South American Rugby Championship "A"
2016 South American Rugby Championship "B"
2016 South American Rugby Championship "C"

References

2016
2016 rugby union tournaments for national teams
   
2016 in Argentine rugby union
rugby union
rugby union
International rugby union competitions hosted by Uruguay
International rugby union competitions hosted by Chile